is an actor, voice actor, model and tarento management firm established on February 16, 2000 in Shibuya, Tokyo, Japan.

Clients
Listed alphabetically by gender and surname.

Male

Rokurō Abe
Kazuo Arai
Keisuke Arimura
Shinpei Asanuki
Itaru Fujimoto
Shinji Furukawa
Satoru Hamaguchi
Homare Hasegawa
Tatsuo Hēderu
Jin Honda
Kiyozumi Honda
Kiyohiko Ichihara
Masahiro Itō
Eiken Jōji
Sukekiyo Kameyama
Tarō Kanasugi
Tomotaka Kanzaki
Kōichi Kase
Osamu Katō
Yasuke Kawarada
Tomimasa Kikuguchi
Yūtarō Kikuhara
Yūichi Kizaki
Mitsumasa Kishimoto
Akira Kubo
Kyūtarō
Masaaki Maeda
Akira Matsumura
Hikojirō Matsumura
Shigeo Matsuzaki
Yūzō Mikawa
Keisuke Miyata
Kōta Mizumori
Kiyuki Mori
Kōji Muta
Masakazu Nagakura
Kensei Nakata
Katsumi Nakayama
Satoshi Ninomiya
Shūgo Nishiyama
Shinji Nomura
Ryūhei Numata
Yū Numazaki
Tadashi Okuno
Hiroshi Ōtsuka
Katsuhiro Oyama
Saikatsu
Akira Satō
Yūichi Satō
Masaru Saitō
Kazunori Shigeki
Taizō Shiina
Eiji Shima
Kei Sunaga
Tatsuya Suzuki
Jin Tamagawa
Mitsutaka Tanaka
Ryū Tenkenji
Takao Toji
Toshio
Yūsuke Tozawa
Jun Yakushiji
Momoki Yamada
Kappa Yamaguchi
Mitsuru Yamazaki
Itaru Yoshimoto

Female

Rumiko Amemiya
Kazuyo Aoki
Chikako Asai
Takako Ashizawa
Keiko Azuma
Matsumi Fuku
Yōko Fujimoto
Mai Fujisaki
Miho Hirata
Kei Hirosawa
Akiko Hoshino
Chieko Ichikawa
Nori Ichinose
Mami Inoue
Chika Itō
Yoriko Kamimura
Hiroko Kaneko
Chiemi Karaki
Chizuko Kida
Kaori Kikuchi
Emima Kimura
Midori Kimura
Mika Kinose
Michie Kita
Chie Kitagawa
Tomomi Kiuchi
Setsuko Kobayashi
Kotoyo Komori
Ayuko Koyama
Machiko Matsuda
Akira Matsuoka
Yōko Mikami
Yūko Miwa
Junko Miyauchi
Kōko Mori
Akari Moriya
Yōko Nakayanagi
Atsuko Nakazawa
Yoshimi Narita
Konomi Ogasawara
Marie Ōmura
Emiko Onda
Mari Sakai
Hana Shimaoka
Eri Shimomura
Ako Suizu
Hiromi Suzuki
Moyu Taguchi
Kayo Takasaki
Yū Tateishi
Kumiko Tatsuzuki
Michiko Tomura
Yoshie Uehara
Taka Uenohara
Miyoko Yamaguchi
Yuriko

References

External links
 Kiraboshi Official Site

Japanese companies established in 2000
Talent agencies based in Tokyo
Japanese voice actor management companies
2000 establishments in Japan
Japanese talent agencies
Business services companies established in 2000